Akbarpur is a village in Agra tehsil of  Agra district, Uttar Pradesh state of India.

Demographics
As of 2011 Indian Census, Akbarpur had a total population of 2,498, of which 1,323 were males and 1,175 were females. Population within the age group of 0–6 years was 439.

References

Villages in Agra district